Established in 1996, the Wireless Innovation Forum is a non-profit "mutual benefit corporation" dedicated to advocating for spectrum innovation and advancing radio technologies that support essential or critical communications worldwide. Forum members bring a broad base of experience in Software Defined Radio, Cognitive Radio and Dynamic Spectrum Access technologies in diverse markets and at all levels of the wireless value chain to address emerging wireless communications requirements. The forum acts as a venue for its members to collaborate to achieve these objectives.

History
The Wireless Innovation Forum was founded in 1996 originally as "The Modular Multifunction Information Transfer System Forum". The organization was created at the request of the US military services (led by the Air Force) as an industry association focused on advancing the development of software radio. In 1996, the forum formed the Mobile Working Group to develop software specifications and standards supporting ground mobile radios.

The forum published its first technical report in 1997, outlining the current state of the art in software defined radio. This document included a reference application framework for software defined radios, referred to as the Software Radio Architecture, that was developed based on the existing SPEAKeasy Architecture. The late 1990s, also saw the initial meeting between the forum and what later became the Joint Tactical Radio System.

In 1998, the Modular Multifunction Information Transfer System Forum changed its legal name to The Software Defined Radio Forum and began doing business with a broader focus on commercial and international participation. The forum created three new internal groups — Markets and Regulatory Committees and the Base Station Work Group. Also, the forum published a revised technical report.

In 2001, the forum contracted with Communications Research Centre Canada to provide an SCA Reference Implementation (SCARI-Open). The forum also made filings with the United States Federal Communications Commission that helped form their public rule making on software defined radio.

In 2002, the forum hosted its first Technical Conference and Product Exposition, which has become an annual event with the presentation of technical papers along with tutorials, workshops and demonstrations.

In 2004 and 2005, the forum reorganized to support its members in exploring technologies that extend beyond it. A key part of this reorganization was the formation of the Cognitive Radio Work Group, which worked to support IEEE P1900.1 in defining standard definitions for Software Defined and Cognitive Radio and to establish a reference architecture for a cognitive radio system.

Between 2004 and 2010, the forum signed memorandums of understanding with multiple international groups to allow collaboration in areas of mutual interest. These groups included the European End to End Efficiency Program, IEICE in Japan, IEEK in Korea, IEEE Standards Association, JTRS and the European Science Foundation. In 2007, the forum initiated the Smart Radio Challenge, a worldwide competition in which student engineering teams design, develop and test technologies that address relevant problems in the advanced wireless market.

In late 2009, the Software Defined Radio Forum was renamed the Wireless Innovation Forum, reflecting the fact that many of the projects undertaken by its members had expanded to include Cognitive Radio, Systems of Systems, Ad Hoc Networks, and Dynamic Spectrum Access Technologies. The forum secured representation in China in 2008 and opened an office in Brussels in 2010 to provide better support for its European members.

Mission and strategy
The Forum's current mission is to  "advance technologies supporting the innovative utilization of spectrum and the development of wireless communications systems, including essential or critical communications systems". The forum's members serve these objectives through four pillars of strategy:

 Advocacy
 Opportunity Development
 Commercialization
 Education

Organizational structure
The forum is organized around three primary committees, whose responsibilities are summarized as follows

 The Spectrum Sharing Committee (SSC): This committee serves as a common industry and government standards body to support the development and advancement of spectrum sharing technologies based on the three-tier architecture proposed for the 3.5 GHz (CBRS Band) rulemaking activities. While the CBRS band is the main focus on the initial activities, the Wireless Innovation Forum aims to advance this technology for all applicable spectrum bands that can benefit from it. More information at http://cbrs.wirelessinnovation.org. 
 The Software Defined Systems (SDS) Committee: This committee focuses on projects in standards creation for software architectures, application programming interfaces, test and certification including defining an industry driven SCA evolution roadmap for the international community. 
 The Advanced Technologies Committee (ATC): The role of the ATC is to advocate for the innovative utilization of spectrum, and advancing radio technologies that support essential or critical communications; it defines and publishes the forum's "Top 10 Most Wanted Wireless Innovations" list, manages the Forum's Advocacy Agenda, and is responsible for investigating and launching new Forum projects.

These committees are managed by the forum's elected officers, which include the chair, vice chair, technical director, the chairs of the User Requirements and Regulatory Committees, the secretary, and the treasurer according to the forum's bylaws.

Organizational structure is available at http://www.wirelessinnovation.org/projects-committees.

Membership
The membership of the Wireless Innovation Forum consists of commercial, defense, and civil government organizations at all levels of the wireless value chain, including wireless service providers, network operators, component and equipment manufacturers, hardware and software developers, regulatory agencies, and academia. Currently numbering more than 80, the Wireless Innovation Forum's membership spans Asia-Pacific (approximately 15%), Europe (approximately 25%), and North America (approximately 60%).

Achievement awards
Each year, the forum presents three achievement awards. 

 Wireless Innovation Forum Leadership Award (Replaces the International Achievement Award): This award is presented to an individual, group of individuals, or organization that made especially significant contributions in furthering the global mission of the Wireless Innovation Forum.
 Wireless Innovation Forum President’s Award (Replaces the Contributors Award): This Award is presented to individuals in recognition of their sustained outstanding contributions in support of the Wireless Innovation Forum and its activities.

 Wireless Innovation Forum Technology of the Year: This award is presented to an individual or organization for a breakthrough product or technology related to the WInnForum's top 10 most wanted innovation list (http://www.wirelessinnovation.org/top-ten-wireless-innovations).

Winners of the Wireless Innovation Forum Awards over the years can be found here: Link to Awards Listing
Awards are also made each year to the authors of the top papers from the previous year's Technical Conference, as determined by an independent panel of judges.

References

External links
 
 CBRS Standards site
 Current Projects
 Operations Plan
 Annual Technical Conference
 Member listing
 Europe Office and annual Europe Conference

Innovation organizations
501(c)(6) nonprofit organizations
Wireless technology people
Organizations established in 1996
Software-defined radio